Desulfurella multipotens is a thermophilic sulfur-reducing eubacterium. It is 1.5–1.8 by 0.5–0.7 μm in size, Gram-negative, rod-shaped, motile, with a single polar flagellum.

References

Further reading

External links
LPSN

Type strain of Desulfurella multipotens at BacDive -  the Bacterial Diversity Metadatabase

Campylobacterota
Bacteria described in 1996